Clare Isobel Fell (10 October 1912 – 17 July 2002) was a British archaeologist.

She was born in Ulverston, Lancashire (now Cumbria), England. She read archaeology at Newnham College, Cambridge in the 1930s. The university did not allow women to take degrees at that time, and she received her MA in 1948. After the Second World War she worked at the Museum of Archaeology and Anthropology in Cambridge before moving back to Ulverston in 1953.

In 1949 she worked on Grahame Clark's excavations at the Star Carr Mesolithic site in Yorkshire. 
Around the same time she began studying the Langdale axe industry in Cumbria, the project for which she is perhaps best remembered. She was not the first person to notice that Neolithic axes had been produced in Great Langdale, but she was able to demonstrate the scale of the activity there, and used the word "factory" to describe it. She also guessed correctly that other quarries would be found on outcrops of volcanic tuff in the Lake District.

Fell kept up to date with scientific advances and collaborated with Winifred Pennington in the study of the effects of humans on the environment, resulting in pioneering pollen analyses for prehistoric artefact layers from sites in Cumbria.

Television appearance
Fell appeared in a discussion panel on the BBC television series Animal, Vegetable, Mineral? on 9 July 1953. The programme was directed by David Attenborough.

Bibliography
Clare Fell, The Great Langdale stone-axe factory, Trans Cumberland and Westmorland Antiq and Arch Soc, 50, 1-13 (1950).

References

David Barrowclough. Prehistoric Cumbria. 2010

British archaeologists
British women archaeologists
20th-century British women scientists
Alumni of Newnham College, Cambridge
1912 births
Place of birth missing
2002 deaths
People from Ulverston
20th-century British women writers
20th-century archaeologists